

See also
 Screwed the Pooch
 Screwed Pooch